Scarlet  is a bright red color, sometimes with a slightly orange tinge. In the spectrum of visible light, and on the traditional color wheel, it is one-quarter of the way between red and orange, slightly less orange than vermilion.

According to surveys in Europe and the United States, scarlet and other bright shades of red are the colors most associated with courage, force, passion, heat, and joy. In the Roman Catholic Church,  scarlet is the color worn by a cardinal, and is associated with the blood of Christ and the Christian martyrs, and with sacrifice.

Scarlet is also associated with immorality and sin, particularly prostitution or adultery, largely because of a passage referring to "The Great Harlot", "dressed in purple and scarlet",  in the Bible (Revelation 17:1–6).

Uses and varieties

Etymology 

The word comes from the Middle English "scarlat", from the Old French escarlate, from the Latin "scarlatum",
from the Persian  saqerlât. The term scarlet was also used in the Middle Ages for a type of cloth that was often bright red.  An early recorded use of scarlet as a color name in the English language dates to 1250.

History

Ancient world
Scarlet has been a color of power, wealth and luxury since ancient times. Scarlet dyes were first mentioned in 8th century BC, under the name Armenian Red, and they were described in Persian and Assyrian writings. The color was exported from Persia to Rome. During the Roman Empire, it was second in prestige only to the purple worn by the Emperors.  Roman officers wore scarlet cloaks called paludamenta, and persons of high rank were referred to as the coccinati, the people of red.

The color is also mentioned several times in the Bible, both in the Old and New Testament; in the Latin Vulgate version of the book of Isaiah (1:18) it says, "If your sins be as scarlet (si fuerint peccata vestra ut coccinum) they shall be made white as snow", and in the book of Revelation (17:1-6) it describes the "Great Harlot" (meretricius magnus) dressed in scarlet and purple (circumdata purpura et coccino), and riding upon a scarlet beast (besteam coccineam).

The Latin term for scarlet used in the Bible comes from coccus, a "tiny grain". The finest scarlets in ancient times were made from the tiny scale insect called kermes, which fed on certain oak trees in Turkey, Persia, Armenia and other parts of the Middle East. The insects contained a very strong natural dye, also called kermes, which produced the scarlet color. The insects were so small they were historically thought to be a kind of grain. This was the origin of the expression "dyed in the grain."

Middle Ages and Renaissance 
The early Christian church adopted many of the symbols of the Roman Empire, including the importance of the color scarlet. The flag of the Crusaders was a scarlet cross on a white background, with scarlet indicating blood and sacrifice. By a church edict in 1295, Cardinals of the church, second in authority to the Pope, wore red robes, but a red closer in color to the purple of the Byzantine Emperors, a color coming from murex, a type of mollusk. After the fall of Constantinople to the Turks in 1453, however, the imperial purple was no longer available, and Cardinals began instead to wear scarlet made from kermes.

During the Middle Ages and Renaissance, scarlet was the color worn by Kings, princes and the wealthy, partly because of its color and partly because of its high price. The exact shade, which varied widely, was not as important as the brilliance and richness of the color. The finest scarlet, called scarlatto or Venetian scarlet, came from Venice, where it was made from kermes by a specific guild which closely guarded the formula. Cloth dyed scarlet cost as much as ten times more than cloth dyed with blue.

16th to 19th century 
In the Assumption, by Titian (1516-1518), the figures of God, the Virgin Mary and two apostles are highlighted by their scarlet costumes, painted with vermilion pigment from Venice. The young Queen Elizabeth I (here in about 1563) liked to wear bright reds, before she adopted the more sober image of the Virgin Queen. Her satin gown was probably dyed with kermes. In the 16th century, an even more vivid scarlet began to arrive in Europe from the New World. When the Spanish conquistadores conquered Mexico, they found that the Aztecs were making brilliant red shades from another variety of scale insect called cochineal, similar to the European kermes vermiilo, but producing better shades of red at lower costs. The first shipments were sent from Mexico to Seville in 1523. The Venetian guilds at first tried to block the use of the cochineal in Europe, but before the century was over, it was being used to make scarlet dye in Spain, France, Italy, and Holland, and almost all the fine scarlet garments of Europe were made with cochineal.

Scarlet was the traditional color of the British nobility in the 17th and 18th century. The members of the House of Lords wore red ceremonial gowns for the opening of Parliament, and today sit on red benches.

The red military uniform was adopted by the British Army in 1645, and was still worn as a dress uniform until the outbreak of the First World War in August 1914. Ordinary soldiers wore red coats dyed with madder, while officers wore scarlet coats dyed with the more expensive cochineal. This led to British soldiers being known as red coats.

20th and 21st century
From the 8th century until the early 20th century, the most important scarlet pigment used in western art was vermilion, made from the mineral cinnabar. It was used, along with red lake pigments, by artists from Botticelli and Raphael to Renoir.  However, in 1919 commercial production began of an intense new synthetic pigment, cadmium red, made from cadmium sulfide and selenium.  The new pigment became the standard red of Henri Matisse and the other important painters of the 20th century.

In the 20th century, scarlet also became associated with revolution. Red flags had first been used as revolutionary emblems, symbolizing the blood of martyrs, during the French Revolution and Paris uprisings in 1848.  Red became the color of socialism, then communism, and became the color of the flags of both the Soviet Union and Communist China. China still uses a scarlet flag; in Chinese culture red is also the color of happiness. Since the fall of the Soviet Union the flag of Russia is red, blue and white, the colors of the historic Russian flag from the time of Peter the Great, adapted by him from the colors of the Dutch flag.

In science and nature

Scarlet in culture

Academic dress

Scarlet is the color worn in traditional academic dress in the United Kingdom for those awarded doctorates.  It is also the color of many of the undergraduate gowns worn by students of the ancient universities of Scotland.

In academic dress in the United States, scarlet is used for hood bindings (borders) and, depending on the university or school, other parts of the dress (velvet chevrons, facings, etc.) to denote a degree in some form or branch of Theology (e.g., Sacred Theology, Canon Law, Divinity, Ministry).

In the French academic dress system, the five traditional fields of study (Arts, Science, Medicine, Law and Divinity) are each symbolized by a distinctive color, which appears in the academic dress of the people who graduated in this field. Scarlet is the distinctive color for Law. As such, it is also the color worn on their court dress by French high magistrates.

Film and television 

 Captain Scarlet and the Mysterons was a British 1960s science-fiction marionette TV series. The captains are all named after a color, including Scarlet, Magenta, White and Grey.
 The Scarlet Pumpernickel is a 1950 Looney Tunes short starring Daffy Duck, a parody of The Scarlet Pimpernel.
 Wanda Maximoff aka Scarlet Witch is the protagonist of WandaVision the 2021 Television miniseries.

Literature

 The novel The Scarlet Letter by 19th-century American writer Nathaniel Hawthorne depicts the life of the fictional character Hester Prynne, who wears a prominent scarlet letter "A" (for "adulteress") on her chest as a punishment for adultery.
 A Study in Scarlet was an 1888 detective-mystery novel by Sir Arthur Conan Doyle, introducing and featuring Sherlock Holmes, solving a baffling mystery whose main clue was a message painted on a wall in blood.
 The Scarlet Pimpernel was a popular play and novel about intrigue and adventure during the French Revolution, written by Baroness Emmuska Orczy. The play was first staged in London in 1903, about an English lord, Sir Percy Blakely (Blakeney), who wore a disguise and rescued French nobles from the guillotine during the French Revolution. He was supported by a secret club, the League of the Scarlet Pimpernel, and left the red flower of that name as his calling card. The Baroness later converted her play into a highly successful novel, upon which several movies were based. The hero, who lived a double life as a foppish British aristocrat by day and a disguised fighter for justice by night, inspired later heroes such as Batman and Superman.

Military
 In the modern British army, scarlet is still worn by the Foot Guards, the Life Guards, and by some regimental bands or drummers for ceremonial purposes. Officers and NCOs of those regiments which previously wore red retain scarlet as the color of their "mess" or formal evening jackets. The Royal Gibraltar Regiment has a scarlet tunic in its winter dress.
 Scarlet is worn for some full dress, military band or mess uniforms in the modern armies of a number of the countries that made up the former British Empire. These include the Australian, Jamaican, New Zealand, Fijian, Canadian, Kenyan, Ghanaian, Indian, Singaporean, Sri Lankan and Pakistani armies.
 The musicians of the United States Marine Corps Band wear red, following an 18th-century military tradition that the uniforms of band members are the reverse of the uniforms of the other soldiers in their unit. Since the US Marine uniform is blue with red facings, the band wears the reverse.
 The Brazilian Marine Corps wears a red dress uniform.
 Red Serge is the uniform of the Royal Canadian Mounted Police, created in 1873 as the North-West Mounted Police, and given its present name in 1920. The uniform was adapted from the tunic of the British Army. Cadets at the Royal Military College of Canada also wear red dress uniforms.
 Scarlet is the branch color of the United States Army Field Artillery Corps.
 Scarlet and gold are the colors of the United States Marine Corps.
 Scarlet is the color of the beret given to United States Air Force Combat Controllers, after completion of Combat Control School at Pope Air Force Base.

Orders and decorations
 Scarlet is the color of the robes and sash of the Order of the Bath in the United Kingdom, and the Order has a Gentleman Usher of the Scarlet Rod.

Religion
In the Roman Catholic Church, scarlet robes — symbolizing the color of the blood of Christ and the Christian martyrs — are worn by cardinals as a symbol of their willingness to defend their faith with their own blood. In the Lutheran tradition, scarlet is the color for paraments for Palm or Passion Sunday, and for all of Holy Week through Maundy Thursday.

Prostitution
In countries that have traditionally been dominated by Christian ideas, scarlet is associated with prostitution. The Book of Revelation refers to the Whore of Babylon riding upon a "scarlet beast" and dressed in purple and scarlet. The phrase Great Scarlet Whore has been used by Puritans in the 17th century, and the phrase The Scarlet Woman was used by many Protestants and later Mormons in North America well into the 20th century. Scarlet and crimson are also linked to the Judeo-Christian concept of sin in the Book of Isaiah, rendered in the King James Version "though your sins be as scarlet, they shall be as white as snow; though they be red like crimson, they shall be as wool."

The connection of red or scarlet with prostitution was very common in Europe and America. Prostitutes were obliged to wear red in some European cities, and even today areas in European cities where prostitutes can work legally are known as red-light districts. Sex worker advocacy groups like the Scarlet Alliance use the striking color to associate themselves with prostitution.

Sports

 The Scarlets are the name of a Welsh professional rugby union team, and play in scarlet.
 The Scarlet Knights are the nickname of the athletic teams of Rutgers University–New Brunswick. Scarlet is the official color of both the athletic teams and the institution.
 The Atlanta Braves has scarlet red as one of the team colors.
 The official colors of the University of Nebraska–Lincoln athletic teams are scarlet and cream.
 The official colors of Ohio State University athletic teams are scarlet and gray.
 The official colors Illinois Institute of Technology athletic teams are scarlet and gray. 
 The official colors of Texas Tech University athletic teams are scarlet and black as noted in the fight song.
 The official colors of the Boston University athletic teams are scarlet and white.

Variations of scarlet

Websafe scarlet

This is a variation on the standard RGB or Hex combination that produces a truer Scarlet color on some monitors. It is slightly more orange than the standard Scarlet RGB value of 255, 36, 0, but does give a truer color on displays where the red dominates over the orange and would otherwise make the color appear more as a normal red rather than a genuine Scarlet.

Torch red

This is the color now called scarlet in Crayola crayons. It was originally formulated as torch red in 1998 and then renamed scarlet by Crayola in 2000.

Flame

The first recorded use of flame as a color name in English was in 1590.

The source of this color is the ISCC-NBS Dictionary of Color Names (1955), a color dictionary used by stamp collectors to identify the colors of stamps. A sample of the color "Flame" (color sample #34) is also displayed in the Dictionary online version.

Fire brick

Displayed below is the web color fire brick, a medium dark shade of scarlet/red.

Boston University Scarlet

Displayed adjacent is the color Boston University Scarlet, the color which, along with white, is symbolic of Boston University. The color is identical to Utah Crimson.

See also
 Crimson
 Kermes (dye)
 List of colors
 Red pigments
 Vermilion

References

Citations

Sources 
 
 
 
 

Quaternary colors
Shades of red